YRC could mean:
 Yorkshire Ramblers' Club (YRC), a senior mountaineering and caving club based in Yorkshire, England, UK
 York Railway (reporting mark YRC), a short line railroad operating between York and Hanover, Pennsylvania, U.S.
 YRC Freight, subsidiary of Fortune 500 American trucking company, Yellow Corporation, which was known as YRC Worldwide until 2021